The Valparaiso Express class is a series of 5 container ships built for Hapag-Lloyd. The ships were built by Hyundai Samho Heavy Industries in South Korea and have a maximum theoretical capacity of around 11,519 twenty-foot equivalent units (TEU).

List of ships

See also 
Hamburg Express-class container ship

References 

Container ship classes
Ships built by Hyundai Heavy Industries Group